Banyan VINES is a discontinued network operating system developed by Banyan Systems for computers running AT&T's UNIX System V.

VINES is an acronym for Virtual Integrated NEtwork Service. Like Novell NetWare, VINES's network services are based on the Xerox XNS stack.

James Allchin, who later worked as Group Vice President for Platforms at Microsoft until his retirement on January 30, 2007, was the chief architect of Banyan VINES.

VINES technology 
VINES runs on a low-level protocol known as VIP—the VINES Internetwork Protocol—that is essentially identical to the lower layers of the Xerox Network Systems (XNS) protocols. Addresses consist of a 32-bit address and a 16-bit subnet that map to the 48-bit Ethernet address to route to machines. This means that, like other XNS-based systems, VINES can only support a two-level internet.

A set of routing algorithms, however, sets VINES apart from other XNS systems at this level. The key differentiator, ARP (Address Resolution Protocol), allows VINES clients to automatically set up their own network addresses. When a client first boots up, it broadcasts a request on the subnet asking for servers, which respond with suggested addresses. The client uses the first to respond, although the servers can hand off "better" routing instructions to the client if the network changes. The overall concept resembles AppleTalk's AARP system, with the exception that VINES requires at least one server, whereas AARP functions peer-to-peer. Like AARP, VINES requires an inherently "chatty" network, sending updates about the status of clients to other servers on the internetwork.

Rounding out its lower-level system, VINES uses RTP (the Routing Table Protocol), a low-overhead message system for passing around information about changes to the routing, and ARP to determine the address of other nodes on the system. These closely resemble the similar systems used in other XNS-based protocols. VINES also includes ICP (the Internet Control Protocol), which it uses to pass error-messages and metrics.

At the middle layer level, VINES uses fairly standard software. The unreliable datagram service and data-stream service operate essentially identically to UDP and TCP on top of IP. VINES adds a reliable message service as well, a hybrid of the two that offers guaranteed delivery of single packets.

Banyan offered customers TCP/IP as an extra cost option for owners of standard Vines servers. This extra charge for TCP/IP on VINES servers continued long after TCP/IP server availability had become commoditized.

At the topmost layer, VINES provides the standard file and print services, as well as the unique StreetTalk, a globally consistent name service. Using a globally distributed, partially replicated database, StreetTalk can meld multiple widely separated networks into a single network that allows seamless resource-sharing. It accomplishes this through its rigidly hierarchical naming-scheme; entries in the directory take the form  item@group@organization (similar to the naming format used in the XNS Clearinghouse directory service:  item:group:organization). This applies to user accounts as well as to resources like printers and file servers.

Protocol stack

VINES client software 
VINES client software runs on most PC-based operating systems, including MS-DOS and earlier versions of Microsoft Windows. It is lightweight on the client, and hence remained in use during the latter half of the 1990s on many older machines that could not run other networking stacks. This occurred on the server side as well, as VINES generally offers good performance, even from mediocre hardware.

Initial market release 
With StreetTalk's inherent low bandwidth requirements, global companies and governments that grasped the advantages of worldwide directory services seamlessly spanning multiple time zones recognized VINE's technological edge. Users included gas and oil companies, power companies, public utilities—and U.S. Government agencies including the State Department, Treasury Department, Department of Agriculture, Department of Health and Human Services and Department of Defense.

The U.S. State Department was an early adopter of the VINES technology. Able to take advantage of the then high-speed 56k modems for telephonic connectivity of the developed world to the limited telephone modem speeds of 300 baud over bad analog telephone systems in developing countries, VINES linked embassies around the world.  VINES also features built-in point-to-point and group chat capability that was useful for basic communication over secure lines.

Defense Department adoption 
By the late 1980s, the US Marine Corps was searching for simple, off-the-shelf worldwide network connectivity with rich built-in email, file, and print features. By 1988, the Marine Corps had standardized on VINES as both its garrison (base) and forward-deployed ground-based battlefield email-centric network operating system.

Using both ground-based secure radio channels and satellite and military tactical phone switches, the Marine Corps was ready for its first big test of VINES: the 1990-1991 Gulf War. Units were able to seamlessly coordinate ground, naval, and air strikes across military boundaries by using the chat function to pass target lists and adjust naval gun fire on the fly. Ground fire support coordination agencies used VINES up and down command channels—from Battalion-to-Regiment through Division-to-Corps and Squadron-to-Group to Aircraft Wing-to-Corps, as well as in peer-to-peer unit communication.

VINES competitors 

For a decade, Banyan's OS competitors, Novell and Microsoft, dismissed the utility of directory services. Consequently, VINES dominated what came to be called the "directory services" space from 1985 to 1995. While seeming to ignore VINES, Novell and eventually Microsoft—companies with a flat server or domain-based network model—came to realize the strategic value of directory services. With little warning, Novell went from playing down the value of directory services to announcing its own: NetWare Directory Services (NDS). Eventually, Novell changed NDS to mean Novell Directory Services, and then renamed that to eDirectory.

For Windows 2000 however, Microsoft included Active Directory, an LDAP directory service based on the directory from its Exchange mail server. While VINES is limited to a three-part name, user.company.org, like Novell's NDS structure, Active Directory is not bound by such a naming convention. Active Directory features an additional capability that both NDS and VINES lack, its "forest and trees" organizational model. The combination of better architecture and with marketing from a company the size of Microsoft doomed StreetTalk, VINES as an OS, and finally Banyan itself.

Decline 
By the late 1990s, VINES's once-touted StreetTalk Services's non-flat, non-domain model had lost ground to newer technology, despite its built-in messaging, efficiency and onetime performance edge. Banyan was unable to market its product far beyond its initial base of multi-national and government entities.

The company lost ground in the networking market, and VINES sales dropped. Banyan increasingly turned to StreetTalk as a differentiator, eventually porting it to NT as a stand-alone product and offering it as an interface to LDAP systems. 

Banyan continued to operate a closed OS. This required hardware manufacturers to submit hardware and driver requirements so that Banyan could write drivers for each peripheral. When more open systems with published APIs began to appear, Banyan did not alter their model. This made it difficult for client-side support to handle the explosive growth in, for example, printers. As competitors began to adopt some of VINES's outstanding wide area networking protocols and services, manufacturers were less inclined to send a unit to Banyan for VINES specific drivers when competitors allowed them to write their own.

Dropping the Banyan brand for ePresence in 1999, as a general Internet services company, the firm sold its services division to Unisys in late 2003 and liquidated its remaining holdings in its Switchboard.com subsidiary.

Version history 
1984: Banyan VINES 1.0
1989: Banyan VINES 2.1
1990: Banyan VINES 3.0
1991: Banyan VINES 4.11
1992: Banyan VINES 5.0
1994: Banyan VINES 5.50
1997: Banyan VINES 7.0

References

Resource 
 Banyan VINES at Bamertal Publishing
 Banyan VINES at Coldtail.com

1984 software
Directory services
Discontinued operating systems
Network operating systems
UNIX System V
X86 operating systems
XNS based protocols